The Gau Essen was an administrative division of Nazi Germany from 1933 to 1945 in the northern parts of the Prussian Rhine Province. Before that, from 1928 to 1933, it was the regional subdivision of the Nazi Party in that area.

History
The Nazi Gau (plural Gaue) system was originally established in a party conference on 22 May 1926, in order to improve administration of the party structure. From 1933 onward, after the Nazi seizure of power, the Gaue increasingly replaced the German states as administrative subdivisions in Germany.

At the head of each Gau stood a Gauleiter, a position which became increasingly more powerful, especially after the outbreak of the Second World War, with little interference from above. Local Gauleiters often held government positions as well as party ones and were in charge of, among other things, propaganda and surveillance and, from September 1944 onward, the Volkssturm and the defense of the Gau.

The position of Gauleiter in Essen was held by Josef Terboven throughout the history of the Gau. After the German conquest of Norway in 1940 Hitler promoted Terboven  Reichskommissar for the occupied country, where he ruled with almost absolute power. He committed suicide on 8 May 1945 by detonating 50 kilograms of explosives in a bunker. While Terboven was in Norway, the Deputy Gauleiter, Fritz Schlessmann, ran the Gau in an acting capacity.

The Gau had a size of 1,900 km2 (2,741 sq mi) and a population of 2,800,000, which placed it in mid-table for size and population in the list of Gaue.

References

External links
 Illustrated list of Gauleiter

1928 establishments in Germany
1945 disestablishments in Germany
Essen
Rhine Province under Nazi rule